"West End Pad" is the title of a 1996 hit single by British dance-pop singer-songwriter Cathy Dennis. The song is included on her third album, Am I the Kinda Girl? (1996). It reached No. 25 on the UK charts in August 1996.

Music video
A promotional video was filmed for the song. It begins with Cathy racing back and forth, setting up the microphone, as she prepares to sing the song. Behind her is a video wall consisting of thirty-six screens. Cathy's disembodied lips fill up these screens, as they, too, sing the song.

Track listings
 UK CD 1 single
West End Pad
Baggage
West End Pad (Extended Mix)

 UK CD 2 single
West End Pad
Crazy Ones
Run Like A River
Too Many Walls (Acoustic Mix)

Charts

References

1996 singles
Cathy Dennis songs
Songs written by Cathy Dennis
1996 songs
Polydor Records singles